A long dog (also long-dog or longdog) is any dog of sighthound type, whether pure-bred or not. It is usually a cross-breed between two sighthounds of different breeds, one of which is usually a Greyhound It is distinct from the lurcher, which is a cross between a sighthound and a working dog, usually a terrier or herding dog.  And it is larger than a Feist, which is an American cross.

Notes

Further reading 

 E.G. Walsh (1977). Lurchers and Longdogs. Woodbridge: Boydell.
  (1990). Longdogs by Day. Woodbridge: Boydell.
 D.B. Plummer (1993). Lurcher and Long Dog Training. London: Robinson Publishing.

Dog types
Sighthounds
Dog crossbreeds